The Kidder Covered Bridge carries Kidder Hill Road across the South Branch Saxtons River, just south of the village center of Grafton, Vermont.  The bridge was built about 1870, and is Grafton's last surviving 19th-century covered bridge.  It is the shortest historic covered bridge in Windham County, and was listed on the National Register of Historic Places in 1973.

Description and history
It rests on abutments of stone that have been reinforced with concrete. The bridge is oriented at a skew to the river bed, with its trusses forming a parallelogram, 15° off rectangular. The exterior of the trusses is sheathed in vertical board siding, and it is covered by a metal roof. The siding is extended to the portals and gables, and a short way into the portal.

The original covered bridge was constructed circa 1870, and was the town's last 19th-century bridge until it was rebuilt in 1995.  It is the county's only example of a queenspost truss bridge, and is one of a handful of covered bridges in the state built with a skew.

The bridge was replaced with a new wooden (covered) structure in April 1995.

See also
National Register of Historic Places listings in Windham County, Vermont
List of bridges on the National Register of Historic Places in Vermont
List of Vermont covered bridges

References

Covered bridges on the National Register of Historic Places in Vermont
Bridges completed in 1870
Buildings and structures in Grafton, Vermont
National Register of Historic Places in Windham County, Vermont
Historic district contributing properties in Vermont
Road bridges on the National Register of Historic Places in Vermont
Wooden bridges in Vermont
Queen post truss bridges in the United States
1870 establishments in Vermont